Chindonan Island is located in Coron Bay, in Culion, province of Palawan, Philippines, part of the Calamianes Group of Islands. The island has tropical forest with springs with drinkable freshwater, making it habitable.

Fauna

The island has parrots, kingfishers, eagles and many other birds. Asian water monitors are found in the dense mangroves that surrounds parts of the island.

References

Calamian Islands